Christopher Lowell (born Richard Lowell Madden; November 6, 1955) is an interior decorator and former television personality. He is best known for hosting the television shows Interior Motives and The Christopher Lowell Show. He won a Daytime Emmy Award in 2000 for his work on the latter program.

Beyond his hosting duties, Lowell has also appeared on Hollywood Squares and been a member of the California Boys' Choir. He has designed products for Office Depot and Burlington Coat Factory. In 2008, Lowell hosted a series on Fine Living channel called Work That Room.

Lowell has also written several books.

Lowell left the television business in the late 2000s.

Filmography 
 Interior Motives with Christopher Lowell (1997) – TV series, as host
 The Christopher Lowell Show (1999-2003) – as host (also known as It's Christopher Lowell)
 The Wall to Wall Show (2005) – as host
 You Can Do It (2006) – home decorating series, as host
 Work That Room – home decorating series, as host
 The Martin Short Show (1999, 1 episode) – as himself
 The Tonight Show with Jay Leno (2001, 1 episode) – as himself
 Monster Garage (1 episode) – as himself
 Hollywood Squares (2002, 5 episodes) – as himself
 The Wall to Wall Show (2005, 10 episodes) – as himself
 I Love the '90s: Part Deux (2005) – as himself

Personal life 
Originally from Portsmouth, New Hampshire, Lowell lived in Boston for part of the 1970s, working variously as an actor, art director, pianist and waiter.

Lowell is gay. On his blog, he calls himself "one of the very first gay men ever to host a daily national television show" although this claim has not been verified.

Lowell has dyslexia.

References

External links 
 
 

1955 births
Living people
American interior designers
American television personalities
Television presenters with dyslexia